This is a list of notable Latin Americans in the United Kingdom people, including British people of Latin American ancestry and Latin American-born immigrants.

Business
Jaime Gilinski Bacal, banker and philanthropist, Colombian immigrant

Entertainment
Layla Anna-Lee, TV presenter, Brazilian mother
Paloma Baeza, actress, Mexican father
Michael Bentine, actor/comedian, Peruvian father
Oona Chaplin, actress, born in Spain, Chilean father
Taio Cruz, singer, Brazilian mother
Henry Ian Cusick, actor, Peruvian mother
Michel de Carvalho, actor, Brazilian father
Nell de Silva, actress, Chilean parents
Alfred Enoch, actor, Brazilian mother
Giovanna Falcone, reality TV star, Argentine mother
Mario Falcone, reality TV star, Argentine mother
Peter Gadiot, actor, Mexican mother
Dhani Harrison, singer, Mexican-American mother
Tara Hoyos-Martínez, 2010 Miss Universe Great Britain, Colombian parents 
Julie Fernandez, actress, Argentine father
Santiago Cabrera, actor, Chilean parents
Olivia Hussey, actress, Argentine father
John Justin, actor, Argentine father
Phil Manzanera, musician, Colombian mother
Wilnelia Merced, Miss World winner, Puerto Rican immigrant
Azela Robinson, actress, Mexican mother
Kaya Scodelario, actress, Brazilian mother
Seal, singer, Brazilian father
Teddy Sinclair, singer, Uruguayan mother
Anya Taylor-Joy, actress, Argentine-British
Sonya Walger, actress, Argentine father
Ed Weeks, actor, Salvadorean mother

Fashion
Alice Dellal, model, Brazilian mother
Jade Jagger, fashion designer, Nicaraguan mother

Medicine and science
Alex Kacelnik, Argentine-born ethologist and zoologist
Claudio Sillero-Zubiri, Argentine-born zoologist
Estela V. Welldon, Argentine forensic psychotherapist and psychiatrist, and author

Politics
Laura Alvarez, human rights lawyer & coffee importer, wife of Labour Party leader Jeremy Corbyn, Mexican immigrant
Bianca Jagger, human rights advocate, Nicaraguan immigrant
Marie-Chantal, Crown Princess of Greece, wife of Pavlos, Crown Prince of Greece, Ecuadorian mother

Sports
Sergio Agüero ("Kun"), Argentine footballer for Manchester City
Yamilé Aldama, triple jumper, Cuban immigrant
Steven Alzate, British-born footballer of Colombian descent
Osvaldo Ardiles, former Argentine footballer and football coach 
Marcos Ayerza, Argentine rugby union player for Leicester Tigers
Jean Beausejour, Chilean footballer for Wigan Athletic
Gonzalo Camacho, Argentine rugby union player for Leicester Tigers
Joe Devera, footballer, Venezuelan father
Ignacio Elosu, Argentine rugby union player for Exeter Chiefs
Ben Hockin, swimmer, Paraguayan mother
Gonzalo Jara, Chilean footballer for Nottingham Forest
Nahuel Lobo, Argentine rugby union player for the Newcastle Falcons
Pablo Matera, Argentine rugby union player for Leicester Tigers
Ignacio Mieres, Argentine rugby union player for Worcester Warriors
Diego Poyet, Spanish-born English footballer of Uruguayan descent.
Julián Speroni, Argentine footballer for Crystal Palace FC
Gary Stempel, football coach, Panamanian-British 
Gonzalo Tiesi, Argentine rugby union player for London Welsh

Writers
Tom Burns, publisher, Chilean mother
Caroline Criado-Perez, journalist, Argentine father
Nick Grosso, playwright, Argentine parents
E. L. James, author, Chilean mother
Carlos Lopez-Barillas, writer/photographer, Guatemalan immigrant
James Menendez, journalist, Mexican descent
Gaby Sambuccetti, Argentine poet

See also
 Latin America–United Kingdom relations
Latin American migration to the United Kingdom
 List of Hispanic and Latino Americans

References

Hispanic and Latin American
Hispanic and Latin American Britons
 
Latin America-related lists